Adam Tsekhman is a Canadian actor best known for his role as Gary Green on the television series Legends of Tomorrow.

Early life 
Adam Tsekhman was born in Winnipeg, Manitoba, but raised in Toronto, Ontario. His parents were Ukrainian immigrants of Jewish descent who came to Canada in the early 1970s. While studying finance at the Wharton School of the University of Pennsylvania, he developed a passion for acting, and joined a theatre troupe one of his friends was working at. After graduating from Wharton, Tsekhman wanted to pursue a career in investment banking and attended an interview with Lehman Brothers, but changed his mind and went to Columbia University where he graduated with a Masters in Fine Arts in Theatre Acting.

Career 
After graduating from Columbia University, Tsekhman landed a role in the Russian TV series Zona. He received a best lead actor in a series nomination at the Monte-Carlo Television Festival, but lost to Kiefer Sutherland for 24. Tsekhman then moved to Los Angeles to work on other films and TV series. In 2014, he featured in the Yiddish-language film Tsili as a Jewish refugee named Marek. In 2017, Tsekhman was cast in the third season of The CW's Legends of Tomorrow as Gary Green. Initially intended to appear only for three episodes, he later became a recurring character, and was promoted to the main cast during its sixth season. In 2019, Tsekhman joined the thriller film Dreamland (later retitled Crisis) as an Armenian gangster named Armen.

Filmography

Film

Television

Video games

References

External links 
 
 
 Official website

Canadian male film actors
Canadian male television actors
Jewish Canadian male actors
Living people
Male actors from Winnipeg
Year of birth missing (living people)